Amy Adams Strunk (born September 29, 1955) is an American businesswoman best known as the controlling owner of the National Football League's Tennessee Titans. The daughter of the late owner Bud Adams, Strunk owns half of the Titans franchise, with other members of the family owning the remaining half. The team is currently owned under the banner of KSA Industries, which also owns many of Bud Adams' businesses. Before Strunk took over as controlling owner in 2015, the role belonged to her sister, Susie Adams Smith, whose husband Tommy Smith was team president and CEO.

Early career
Strunk initially attended Pine Manor College but transferred after a year to the University of Texas at Austin, graduating with a degree in history. Born into extreme wealth, Strunk is also involved with her family's other businesses, which includes Bud Adams Ranches, Inc., and is also the president of Kenada Fox Hounds, a fox-hunting organization, and the Little River Oil and Gas Company.

Owner of the Titans
Strunk initially inherited a third of the Tennessee Titans on her father's death, with another third going to her sister, Susie Adams Smith, and the last third to be split equally between Susan Lewis, widow of their brother Kenneth S. Adams III (who died in 1987), and her sons Kenneth S. Adams IV and Barclay Adams. Following two tumultuous years with Smith as controlling owner and her husband Tommy as the chairman, the family decided to pass the mantle down to Strunk.

Within a couple of years, Strunk and Kenneth IV hired longtime business partner Steve Underwood to replace Tommy Smith as team president and CEO and replaced general manager Ruston Webster with Jon Robinson. Strunk was the representing owner for the Titans during a 2015 league vote. In 2016, Strunk was appointed to the NFL's Hall of Fame committee, and was also named to the Board of Trustees for the Pro Football Hall of Fame. Due in large part to Strunk's organization of the Titans 2018 uniform reveal event in downtown Nashville, the NFL granted Nashville the honor of hosting the 2019 NFL Draft. After bringing the Draft to Nashville, Adams was awarded the 2019 Tennessean of the Year by the Tennessee Sports Hall of Fame. On December 12, 2020, it was announced that Susie Adams Smith would sell her share of the Titans to the family-owned KSA Industries. This gives Amy Adams Strunk 50% share of the team, with the other 50% still owned by her nephews, Kenneth Adams IV and Barclay Adams, and Susan Lewis, their mother. Amy Adams Strunk retains controlling ownership.

Unlike her father, Strunk and her nephew have been actively involved with promoting the Titans around Nashville and have been more receptive to feedback from fans and the team's other shareholders. In fact, many fans now affectionately call Strunk by the nickname "Mom."

Other NFL female owners
Other female owners in the NFL include Sheila Ford Hamp (Detroit Lions), Virginia Halas McCaskey (Chicago Bears), Kim Pegula (Buffalo Bills), Carol Davis (Las Vegas Raiders), Denise DeBartolo York (San Francisco 49ers), Gayle Benson (New Orleans Saints),  Janice McNair (Houston Texans), Jody Allen (Seattle Seahawks), and Dee Haslam (Cleveland Browns).  All except Ford Hamp, Haslam, Pegula and York inherited their teams upon the death of their spouse, parent, or other family member.

Personal life
Strunk is an avid equestrian and fox-hunter. Her first marriage ended in divorce in 1990, following a long period of depression that followed her brother's suicide. Her second husband, cattle breeder Tim Strunk, died in a 1997 auto accident. Her current husband Bill Hunt is a former commercial airline pilot. They have residences in Waller, Texas and Nashville, Tennessee. She has three grown children from two previous marriages, Tracy Thompson, Tommy Thompson, and Blanche Strunk.

References

1955 births
21st-century American women
Living people
American sports businesspeople
Women in American professional sports management
People from Texas
Pine Manor College alumni
Tennessee Titans
University of Texas at Austin alumni
Women sports owners
Tennessee Titans owners